The synchronised swimming competition at the 2014 Central American and Caribbean Games was held in Veracruz, Mexico.

The tournament was scheduled to be held from 15–21 November at the Leyes de Reforma Aquatic Center.

Medal summary

Women's events

Medal table

References

External links
Official website

2014 Central American and Caribbean Games events
Central American and Caribbean Games events
2014
Qualification tournaments for the 2015 Pan American Games